The Tyler–Southerland House is a historic house at 36 Southerland Road in Conway, Arkansas.  It is a single-story wood-frame structure, with a gable roof and stone veneer exterior.  Trim consists of cream-colored brick; both it and the veneer pattern are hallmarks of the work of Silas Owens Sr., a regionally prominent African-American mason.  The house was built about 1948, and is a comparatively high style example of Owens's work.  It has Tudor Revival styling, including a small gable over the front entry, and a large gable over a band of windows.  Angled wing walls, an unusual feature not found in most of Owens's houses, flank the main entrance.

The house was listed on the National Register of Historic Places in 2005.

See also
 National Register of Historic Places listings in Faulkner County, Arkansas

References

Houses on the National Register of Historic Places in Arkansas
Tudor Revival architecture in the United States
Houses completed in 1948
Houses in Conway, Arkansas